Albert Williams (4 March 1907 – 1968) was a Welsh footballer who played as an inside forward. He made over 210 Football League appearances in the years before the Second World War.

Career
Bertie Williams was born in Merthyr, and played for Merthyr Town. Alex Raisbeck signed Bertie Williams in August 1926 for Bristol City. He made his debut in the Second Division at inside right in a 3-1 win at South Shields on 24 December 1927. Williams made 14apps scoring 4gls in 1927-28. Bertie Williams made a single appearance for Wales v Northern Ireland in February 1930. Bertie Williams joined Sheffield United for £1,400 in January 1932.

Honours
with Sheffield United
FA Cup runners up 1936

References

1907 births
1968 deaths
Footballers from Merthyr Tydfil
Welsh footballers
Association football forwards
English Football League players
Merthyr Town F.C. players
Sheffield United F.C. players
Bristol City F.C. players
Wales international footballers
FA Cup Final players